The Great Dipper is the third Korean studio album by South Korean singer-songwriter Roy Kim. It was released on December 4, 2015 by MMO Entertainment, and distributed through CJ E&M Music. The album features nine tracks in total, including the eponymous lead single which was the first ballad title track of Kim's career. As of July 2016, The Great Dipper has sold over 7,000 physical copies and 460,000 individual track downloads in Kim's native country (see Roy Kim discography).

Background
In August 2015, during a backstage interview with Billboard K-Town at KCON 2015, Kim previewed his upcoming album: "The third album, I'm working on it. I don't know when it'll come out, but I think it'll be more deep. I don't think people will like it." He added by saying, "It's going to be way more deep. In terms of the topics, and the songwriting, it's going to be very minimal in the way of arranging the music. That could change, it's all a secret, but now I've told you everything."

Two months later, it was announced that Kim had renewed his contract with CJ E&M Music. On November 13, when Kim was filming his new music video, an official from CJ E&M Music stated that the artist was preparing for his comeback while aiming for early December. The comeback date was later confirmed as December 4, according to a teaser image uploaded onto Kim's official SNS accounts. The artist announced, on November 20, that his forthcoming album and its lead single would be entitled The Great Dipper.

Kim expressed his special attachment to stars, which also serve as the album's main theme. On December 1, Kim hosted a show called RoyStar FM on Melon Radio, stating, "Even on ordinary days, I'd written a lot of songs about stars because I thought we resembled them." Kim also said that his new album would be definitely different from his previous studio album since the album has more piano melodies than it has guitar tunes.

Release and reception
On November 18, 2015, a teaser image for the album was revealed, along with a confirmed release date (December 4). The album's artwork also was uploaded through Kim's official SNS channels on November 25. Two days later, a handwritten image of the album's track listing was posted onto Kim's Instagram account. On December 2, a 20-second music video teaser for the title track "The Great Dipper" was released via YouTube.

The album was released digitally at 12:00 am KST on December 4, alongside the music video for its eponymous lead track (directed by music video director Kwon Soon-wook). Upon release, The Great Dipper reached number eight on the Gaon Weekly Album Chart. As of July 2016, the album has sold about 7,200 copies in Kim's native country.

On December 16, Kim released music videos for some of the album's other tracks ("Stay" and "I Want to Love You") onto YouTube, as special gifts for his fans.

Singles

"The Great Dipper"
"The Great Dipper", the album's lead single, is the first ballad title track that Kim has released, while all of his other songs have been acoustic folk songs. Inspired from the Big Dipper, consisting of the seven bright stars which have traditionally guided navigators, the song serenely expresses the emotions of love, separation, and longing experienced by ordinary people. According to the artist's label, the title track also portrays the loneliness and sadness that Kim feels in his daily life. The song is about a man who promises to shine upon the woman he loves no matter where she is, like the Big Dipper.

About writing the song, Kim commented, "At that time, I didn't sleep well studying for my final exams at university. When I stepped outside to watch the sky, I could see the Big Dipper. I began writing the song after being impressed by the fact that we get to see the asterism wherever on Earth stars are visible. (However,) it was actually the Orion's Belt rather than the Big Dipper." He added that "Not only exactly for romance or love, I hope the song becomes a direction for those who are pinched with cold, worried, or disoriented."

"The Great Dipper" peaked at number 30 on the Gaon Digital Chart, having sold nearly 308,000 digital copies domestically as of the first half of 2016.

Promotion
On December 3, 2015, a day prior to the album's release, Kim held a comeback showcase at Understage, Yongsan-gu in Seoul. During the showcase, he premiered "The Great Dipper", "I Want to Love You", and "Stay". He also said that "I think this album peeled off my pretence. It talks about my candid stories that I'd concealed, and reflects the trace of thinking about which direction I should go." The showcase aired through mobile live streaming on Naver's "V" phone application.

The artist began promoting his comeback album on various music programs, starting on KBS's Music Bank (December 4). He promoted the lead single on Music Bank, Show! Music Core (MBC), Inkigayo (SBS), The Show (SBS MTV), Show Champion (MBC Music), and M! Countdown (Mnet). On You Hee-yeol's Sketchbook (KBS), Kim performed the title track and "I Want to Love You".

On November 23, it was announced that Kim would hold his year-end concert which shares the same name as the album's title. For three days from December 18 to 20, the artist performed at Yonsei University's Baekyang Hall in Seoul, to promote the album.

Track listing
English titles are adapted from the iTunes Store, and credits from Naver Music.

Additional notes:
 The title of track 2 refers to the "Big Dipper", the seven brightest stars of the constellation Ursa Major.
 "Remember Me" was originally intended for the soundtrack of the 2015 television series The Producers.
 "The Lullaby" is the only song from the album that was entirely written in English.

Credits and personnel
Credits are adapted from the album's liner notes.

Locations

 Recorded at Brownstone Studio, Nashville, TN 
 Recorded at Jane's Place Studio, Nashville, TN 
 Recorded at The Village Studios, LA 
 Recorded at ShinShack Studio, Nashville, TN 
 Recorded at Booming Sound 
 Recorded at Live Studio 
 Mixed at Musicabal 
 Mastered at Metropolis Mastering, London

Personnel

 Sang-woo Kim – vocals , lyrics , composer , backing vocals , acoustic guitar , album artist 
 Ji-chan Jung – arranger , acoustic guitar ), keyboard , bass , piano , arranging of additional orchestra , rhodes , music producer
 Eric Darken – percussion 
 Nashville Recording Orchestra – string , brass 
 David Davidson – arranging of orchestra 
 Cody McVey – arranging of orchestra 
 In-young Bak – arranging and conducting of string 
 LA String Ensemble – performing of string 
 Dan Needham – drum 
 Craig Nelson – bass 
 Jun-ho Hong – electric guitar 
 Tim Starnes – recording of string
 Jeff Gartenbaum – recording assistant
 William Centenaro – recording assistant
 Baeho "Bobby" Shin – recording of drum, bass guitar, percussion, bass, and orchestra
 Ben Smith – recording assistant
 Pyung-wook Lee – recording of all vocals and Roy Kim's acoustic guitar
 Si-hwa Nam – recording of all vocals and Roy Kim's acoustic guitar
 Hyun-jung Go – mixing 
 Stuart Hawkes – mastering
 Jung-hoon Kim – executive producer 
 Seok-jun Ahn – executive producer

Charts and sales

Weekly charts

Monthly charts

Year-end charts

Sales

Release history

Footnotes

References

External links
 
 
 
 Roy Kim's official website 

2015 albums
Roy Kim albums
Stone Music Entertainment albums
Korean-language albums
Warner Music Group albums